CHSAA may refer to:
Catholic High School Athletic Association, an athletic association in New York
Colorado High School Activities Association, the high school activities governing body in Colorado